|}

The Eider Chase is National Hunt steeplechase in Great Britain. It is run at Newcastle Racecourse in February, over a distance of about 4 miles and  furlong (4 miles and 122 yards, or ) and during the race there are 25 fences to be jumped.

The race was first run in 1952 and is seen as a trial for the Grand National.  Comply or Die won both races in 2008, however, the 2004 winner, Tyneandthyneagain, was later fatally injured at Aintree. The 2011 race was run in extremely heavy ground, with only three horses completing the marathon.

Winners

See also
 Horse racing in Great Britain
 List of British National Hunt races

References

Racing Post:

External links
 Race Recordings 

National Hunt races in Great Britain
Newcastle Racecourse
National Hunt chases
1952 establishments in England
Recurring sporting events established in 1952